Campestigma is a species of plants in the family Apocynaceae first described as a genus in 1912. It contains only one known species, Campestigma purpurea, native to Laos and Vietnam.

References

Flora of Laos
Flora of Vietnam
Asclepiadoideae
Monotypic Apocynaceae genera